Hadda is a small village in the Punjab province of Pakistan. It is also famous by this name Hadda Ghughan Da(ہڈا گھگھاں دا). It is more than 300 years old and the native inhabitants speak the Jhang dialect of the Punjabi language. The area used to be savannah before allotment of lands in 1875 and construction of irrigation canals in 1905.

There are two mosques and Imam Bargah and people live a simple life. There is primary school for both boys and girls. The literacy rate remained static for many years after partition but has increased in recent years. The population is about 4,000. These people are actually the original inhabitants of Kirana Bar before the irrigation canals were constructed, and new villages called chaks were created in the whole area by the British Government. Major casts are  Ghugh, Momba Pathan and few residents of Khokhar, Nissioana, Gondal.

Location
Hadda is about from the Pakistani city of Sargodha.
The nearest villages are Chak 86 SB to the east, Chak 84SB to the west, Chak 81SB to the north and Chak 89SB to the south. The villagers are hardworking and most earn their livelihood through farming. There are several different ethnic groups in the village including Mochi Pathan, Nisowana, Gondal and Khokhar

Notable residents
Mahar Kabir Ali Ghugh from the village, son of Maher Shair Muhammad Ghugh who has seven sons. Maher Kabir Ali Ghugh graduated in 1936 from the University of the Punjab Lahore and later served in the British Government for some time before joining the Pakistan Muslim League. He made a great contribution to the resettlement of Muslim refugees coming from India after 1947. Two young men from the village served in the British Army during World War II. One of the brother Of Maher Kabir Ali Ghugh, Maher Ajmair Khan Ghugh also served in education dep. He was the Head of Govt High School Bhagtanwala(choki). 

Populated places in Sargodha District